The 1991 European Curling Championships were held from December 8 to 14 at the Patinoire de Chamonix in Chamonix, France.

Teams from Germany won both the men's and women's event. On the men's side, Roland Jentsch won his only European Championship of his career. It was Germany's second men's title. Andrea Schöpp led Germany to her fourth European title, and the country's fifth women's European championship.

Men's

A Tournament

Group A

Playoffs

Women's

Group A

Tiebreaker
 6-5 
 5-4

Playoffs

References

External links

European Curling Championships, 1991
European Curling Championships, 1991
European Curling Championships
International curling competitions hosted by France
Sport in Chamonix
December 1991 sports events in Europe